The Äksi Monument of the War of Independence is a monument commemorating the Estonian War of Independence from 1918 to 1920. It is located in Tartu Parish in the village of Voldi, near the northern end of the village of Äksi where the road Äksi-Kukulinna joins the road Tartu-Jogeva-Aravete.

History 
The monument to the fallen from the region of Äksi was opened on June 28, 1925. Twenty years later, the figure on the top was demolished. A replica of the statue was made and the monument reopened on August 27, 1989, roughly a year after the government of the Estonian SSR declared its sovereignty from the Soviet Union during the Singing Revolution.

Description 
From both streets stone paths lead over a meadow to the left and the front side of the monument. They end at a slight elevation, where four steps each lead to a square surface completely covered with stone slabs. In the middle there is a three-step pedestal, on which a granite column – which also tapers above with a three-step staircase – stands. On the top a simple soldier made of bronze is placed; he holds a rifle in his hands.

On the front side of the column there is an oak leaves wreath made of bronze in the lower half. In the upper half there is a text engraved with the year of the Revolutionary War and a reference to the location:

On the back of the column the names of 34 victims are engraved.

Sources 
 Kultuurimälestiste riiklik register: 27114 Vabadussõja mälestussammas

External links 
 National Registry of Cultural Monuments
Monument to the War of Independence in Äksi

Monuments and memorials in Estonia
Tourist attractions in Tartu County
Buildings and structures in Tartu County
Tartu Parish